Darbha is a town in Bastar district, Chhattisgarh, India.

Geography

Location
Darbha is connected to Jagdalpur by National Highway 30. Nearest airport is Raipur Airport.

Places of interest
 Indravati National Park
 Kanger Ghati National Park
 Chitrakot Waterfalls

References

External links
 About Darba

Cities and towns in Bastar district